List of Government of Maharashtra's Engineering Colleges

List of Government of Maharashtra's-Aided Engineering Colleges

List of University Department Institutes

List of University Managed Institutes

 Deemed University (Maharashtra Government funded)

See also 
 List of Government Polytechnic colleges in Maharashtra
 List of Kerala Government Engineering Colleges
 List of Rajasthan Government Engineering Colleges
 List of Tamil Nadu Government Engineering Colleges

 
Lists of Indian state Government Engineering Colleges
Government Engineering Colleges
Bangalore college